Walter Lienhard (15 May 1890 – June 1973) was a Swiss sports shooter. He competed at the 1920, 1924 and the 1948 Summer Olympics.

References

External links
 

1890 births
1973 deaths
Swiss male sport shooters
Olympic shooters of Switzerland
Shooters at the 1920 Summer Olympics
Shooters at the 1924 Summer Olympics
Shooters at the 1948 Summer Olympics
Sportspeople from the canton of Solothurn